"24.000 baci", also spelled "24 mila baci", is a 1961 song composed by Ezio Leoni, Piero Vivarelli, Lucio Fulci, and Adriano Celentano.  The song premiered at the 11th edition of the Sanremo Music Festival with a double performance of Adriano Celentano and Little Tony, and placed at the second place. It is regarded as the first rock and roll song to enter the competition at the Sanremo Festival. During his performance, Celentano created a large controversy for performing part of the song with his back to the public.

The song has been described as a "portrait of the disenchanted youth of that time, not inclined to romanticism, and on the threshold of sexual liberation".

Track listing

 7" single – J 20127 
 "24.000 baci"  (Ezio Leoni, Piero Vivarelli, Lucio Fulci, Adriano Celentano)
 "Aulì-ulè" (Ezio Leoni, Beretta)

Charts

Covers
The song had a large success in France with the version performed by Johnny Hallyday titled "24.000 baisers". It was covered in English by Claudio Simonetti with the title "Four An'Twenty Thousand Kisses". Other artists who covered the song include Dalida, Connie Francis, Fausto Papetti, Jenny Luna, Carla Boni, Peter Koelewijn

In 1999, Greek musician Christos Dantis covered 24.000 baci, and the song was subsequently used as the main soundtrack to the 1999  blockbuster Greek comedy film Safe Sex written and directed by Michalis Reppas and Thanasis Papathanasiou. 

In 2005, Mexican singer Thalía recorded a Spanish version of the song called 24,000 Besos for her album El Sexto Sentido. The song was planned to be the third single from the album's third single but was replaced with Seducción. Even though it was not released as a single, her cover managed to peak at number 83 in Romania.

References

1961 singles
Italian songs
1961 songs
Number-one singles in Italy
Number-one singles in Spain
Sanremo Music Festival songs
Adriano Celentano songs
Thalía songs